Wild in the Sky is a 1972 American action comedy film directed by William T. Naud and starring Georg Stanford Brown, Brandon De Wilde (in his final film role), Keenan Wynn, Tim O'Connor, and Dick Gautier. The film was released as Black Jack in New York in December 1973. The film was released by American International Pictures in March 1972.

Plot
Three draft age boys are caught with marijuana during the Vietnam War era. The judge hates "Hippies" so sentences them to prison. The driver of the bus taking them to prison must go to the bathroom, so he stops at a remote and poorly maintained wayside to use its outhouse. The outhouse floor is rotted and the driver plunges through and is killed by the fall.

The driver hadn't set the parking brake on the prison bus, so the bus rolls down the highway and falls into and down a canyon with the three boys chained on board. They survive, and after some minor trouble free themselves from the wrecked bus. They then find their driver, dead. They realize that the bus fell into an Air Force base where troops are gathering for transport to the war overseas. They plot to steal uniforms, board a troop transport plane, and get off in the Philippines – figuring that since they are not on any passenger list they will make a clean get-away.

The three boys know nothing about air force planes and board a B 52 bomber instead of a troop passenger plane. The bomber crew quickly realize that the three new guys know nothing about working on a bomber crew. Having been found out, the three boys take over the bomber, planning to take the hijacked bomber to Cuba. When they find out that the B52 is carrying an atomic bomb, they realize that the United States will destroy the aircraft rather than let them escape to Cuba with a nuclear weapon, and give up that plan.

All the bomber crew except the pilot decide to escape and parachute out, abandoning the plane. The movie ends with a view of the bomber flying aimlessly over the United States.

Cast
Georg Stanford Brown as Lynch
Brandon deWilde as Josh
Keenan Wynn as Gen. Harry Gobohare
Tim O'Connor as Sen. Bob Recker
Dick Gautier as Diver (as Richard Gautier)
Robert Lansing as Major Reason
James Daly as The President
Michael Fox
Larry Hovis as Capt. Breen
Bernie Kopell as Penrat
Karl Lucas
Emby Mellay
Chet Stratton
Dub Taylor as Officer Roddenberry
Joe Turkel as Corazza
Phil Vandervort as Woody

References

External links

1970s action comedy films
American action comedy films
1972 films
American International Pictures films
1972 comedy films
1970s English-language films
1970s American films